Gordon Chiesa is American basketball coach: he served as the assistant coach for the Utah Jazz for 16 seasons from 1989–90 to 2004–05.

Early life
Gordon Chiesa is a native of Union City, New Jersey.

As a college student, Chiesa played point guard and left St. Thomas Aquinas as the school's all-time leader in career assists (448) and assists average (8.1 apg).  He led the Spartans to a 21–6 record and a postseason bid his senior year.

Career
Chiesa's career began as the athletic director and head basketball coach at his alma mater of St. Thomas Aquinas College in Sparkill, N.Y.  At St. Thomas Aquinas, he guided the Spartans to three 20-win seasons and several postseason tournaments.

Following his tenure at St. Thomas Aquinas, Chiesa served as an assistant coach at Dartmouth from 1979 to 1981. He then accepted the head coaching position at Manhattan College, where he coached from 1981 to 1985 and was named the Metro Athletic Conference Coach of the Year in 1983. Chiesa joined Rick Pitino's staff at Providence College as an assistant coach from 1985 to 1987, before becoming head coach for the 1987–88 season. After posting a miserable 11-17 record, Chiesa was replaced as head coach by Rick Barnes who the following season posted an impressive 18-11 record and led the same team to the first round of the NCAA Division I men's basketball tournament.

He joined the Orlando Magic on August 30, 2012 as special consultant to the head coach.  He previously served as a consultant for the NBA Development League for the previous two seasons (2010–12). During his coaching career, Chiesa served as an assistant coach for two Hall of Fame coaches – Jerry Sloan and Rick Pitino.

Chiesa was an assistant coach with the Utah Jazz, for 16 seasons from 1989–90 to 2004–05. During his tenure, he helped guide Utah to a pair of Western Conference crowns, three Midwest Division championships, a regular season record of 809–471 (.632) and 14 consecutive postseason appearances, including 149 playoff games.  Chiesa has also been an assistant coach with New Jersey, Seattle and Memphis, and was the Grizzlies’ director of pro scouting.

Chiesa is one of a select few assistant coaches to serve in both the NBA Finals (1997 and 1998) and the NCAA Final Four (1987).

Chiesa was inducted into the Hudson County, New Jersey Sports Hall of Fame in January 2001 for his achievements as a college and professional basketball coach.  He was also inducted into the New England Basketball Hall of Fame in September 2009.

Personal life
Chiesa and his wife, Nancy, have two sons, Matthew and Craig.

References

Year of birth missing (living people)
Living people
American men's basketball coaches
American men's basketball players
Basketball coaches from New Jersey
Basketball players from New Jersey
College men's basketball head coaches in the United States
Dartmouth Big Green men's basketball coaches
Manhattan Jaspers basketball coaches
Memphis Grizzlies assistant coaches
New Jersey Nets assistant coaches
Orlando Magic assistant coaches
Providence Friars men's basketball coaches
Sportspeople from Union City, New Jersey
St. Thomas Aquinas College faculty
St. Thomas Aquinas Spartans men's basketball players
Utah Jazz assistant coaches